Zimri (Hebrew: זִמְרִי, Zīmrī; lit. “praiseworthy”) son of Salu was the prince or leader of a family within the Tribe of Simeon during the time of the Israelites’ Exodus in the wilderness at the time when they were approaching the Promised Land. The Book of Numbers in the Hebrew Bible describes how, at Abila or Shittim, he took part in the Heresy of Peor, taking as a paramour a Midianite woman, Cozbi. For this sin, Phinehas, grandson of Aaron, killed them both by impaling them on a spear as they had sex.

The incident was then taken by the Israelites as a pretext for the War against the Midianites in Numbers 31.

Interpretations

Judaism
According to a midrash (Tanhuma Pinhas 2.1; Sanhedrin 82b), Zimri was the same person as Shelumiel son of Zurishaddai.

Islam
In Islam, Zimri appears under the name as-Sāmirī (الـسّٰامِرِي). Islam also assigns to him a major role in the earlier affair of the Golden Calf, which is not attested in the Bible, although this is only one of several theories for the man’s identity. The Islamic account attributes to Zimri/Samiri many of the actions which the Hebrew Bible assigns to Aaron - thus exonerating the latter, Islam's prophet Harun, from involvement in the sinful worship of the Calf.

Christianity
According to the Revelations of Saint Bridget, after his death, Zimri's soul was condemned to hell (Book 7, Chapter 19).

Later influence
In the deutero-canonical First Book of Maccabees, the zeal of Mattathias, leader of the Maccabean revolt, is said to be inspired by the 
zeal shown by Phinehas:

Notes

References

Book of Numbers people
Tribe of Simeon
Biblical murder victims
Male murder victims
Deaths by stabbing
Golden calf